Urban Arcana is a campaign setting for the d20 Modern roleplaying game that builds on a small campaign model included in the original rulebook. It adds much in the way of magic and monsters to the game, and contains rules for things such as playing Shadowkind characters.

History
The core book for Wizards of the Coast's d20 Modern Roleplaying Game (2002) included information on the modern day fantasy setting "Urban Arcana". Wizards later developed this into a full setting sourcebook of its own: the Urban Arcana Campaign Setting (2003).

Description
In the world of Urban Arcana, dragons rule the boardrooms and bugbears rule the streets. It is a world where monsters and magic exist, yet the human psyche just cannot fathom them and covers up all supernatural events. Some, however, break that barrier and become aware of the world around them and help Mages, Acolytes, and other magical characters fight with monsters from another realm.

This game takes modern adventures and combines it with a chaotic twist of magic, using creatures and spells familiar to those who play Dungeons & Dragons. The setting is simply Earth as we know it. Slowly creatures from another world, where magic and fantasy rules, have moved into ours. They
are hidden by the human subconscious which disbelieves seeing horns on people's heads or monsters in the subway.

Story
Urban Arcana's story varies from GM to GM, but they usually share these common factors.
Urban Arcana takes place on Earth, or a slight variation of it. Ever since the dawn of time, creatures from another world have been appearing on Earth due to a force called Shadow. Creatures such as Elves, Kobolds, Gnoll, Aasimar, and others have inhabited earth for years, with no memory of the world they came from due to "The Gift of Lethe".
They have always assimilated into human society because most "Mundane" or normal humans believe them to be fictional, and therefore see them as other mundanes.   This is helped along by the fact that the Common tongue of D&D is always identical to the language of the area that they appear in (A sort of Deus Ex Machina to over come language barriers).
In recent years however, Shadow activity has increased, with an influx of new Shadowkind appearing. The reason for this varies from campaign to campaign, some times never being explained at all. This has resulted in the formation of various organizations.
Department 7, from the original d20 Modern. This version is headed by a female Mage, similar to the head agents of spy films. Most players are members of department 7.
The Corsone syndicate, a reference to The Godfather. This mafia appears to be mundane at first, but as the player digs deeper, they find that it is run by shadowkind, usually a Mind Flayer.
The Fraternal Order of Vigilance, a Hate Group dedicated to killing shadowkind. The philanthropic organization is a front for their more sinister means. Usually a villain. The Module might involve trying to expose them, or avoiding them.
The Black Feathers, Eco-Terrorist run by an Elf. Mostly Neutral.
A shadow television network.
Other organizations are corporations that are run by a genie, a medieval themed fast food restaurant run by shadow, or a homeless shelter for recently displaced shadowkind.    One module involves Department 7's benefactor being a Gold Dragon.

World

The player can either be a Mundane, who stumbles upon shadow somehow, or a Shadowkind, who is either already settled, or is trying to fit in. In the world of Urban Arcana, demons can attack, vampires can own Ferraris, and emails can curse players.
The Game is played with d20 Modern rules. Each player starts off with a basic class:
Strong, a player who focuses on dealing damage and physical strength.
Fast, a nimble player who focuses on dexterous feats, as well as speed.
Tough, a player who focuses on withstanding even the most brutal of attacks.
Smart, an intelligent player who uses their knowledge to get ahead.
Dedicated, a wise hero who use their insight to solve problems.
Charismatic, a hero who uses charm and looks to get what they want.

They then can take any advanced class from classic d20 modern, or special urban arcana classes. Some of them are analogs of classic Dungeons and Dragons classes like the Mage (wizard) or Acolyte (cleric). Others are more modern, such as:
Techno Mage, a mage who sacrifices the reliability of paper spellbooks, for the convenience of computers.
Speed Demon, a hero who can operate vehicles as an extension of their own body.
Shadowjack, a magical hacker whose link to the electronic world makes him almost unstoppable... online.
Glamourist, a hero who is the definition of charismatic, and is capable of hiding true intentions and bending people to their will.
The world can be nearly identical to the real world, such as a campaign taking place in London or New York, or completely made up, as is the nature of pen-and-paper RPGs. As the game borrows heavily from Dungeons and Dragons, sharing many spells and items, and mythology. Real world religion and D&D religion are considered equally valid in Urban Arcana, and you can have a Knight of Pelor, or a Christian Acolyte, as the game takes place in the "real world".

Prepackaged campaigns also borrow from pop culture. One adventure, Come for the Reaping, involves your heroes investigating a mansion filled with zombies in a reference to  Resident Evil, complete with the explosive finish.

Urban Arcana is best used as a campaign to transition into. A d20 Modern character and a Dungeons and Dragons character can both be added to Urban arcana, although the D&D one would require modification in order to balance the game.

Scrapped television adaptation
The Sci-Fi Channel had announced plans to create a television show based upon the roleplaying game, but in 2007 the program's listing was removed from Sci-Fi Program Info at NBC Universal Media Village.  Before its removal the Urban Arcana listing had said:
Cities across the globe have been invaded by creatures from a parallel world. These beings have crossed through a portal into the human sphere and don’t plan to obey the laws of the land. Undercover detective Sean Mayhew must protect the human population from the influx of these chameleon-like, mythological creatures. Urban Arcana is based on a Hasbro/Worlds of Wonder role playing game. Aron Coleite (Crossing Jordan) will write; Gary A. Randall and Rockne O’Bannon (The Triangle, Farscape) will executive produce in association with Fox Television Studios.

Reviews
Pyramid
SF Site

References

Campaign settings
D20 System supplements